Achmad Jufriyanto Tohir (born 7 February 1987 in Tangerang, Banten) is an Indonesian professional footballer who plays as a centre-back for Liga 1 club Persib Bandung.

Career statistics

Club

International goals

Scores and results list Indonesia's goal tally first.

Honours

Club
Sriwijaya
 Indonesia Super League: 2011–12
 Indonesian Community Shield: 2010
 Indonesian Inter Island Cup (2): 2010, 2012
Persib Bandung
 Indonesia Super League: 2014
 Indonesia President's Cup: 2015

References

External links
 
 

1987 births
Living people
People from Tangerang
Sportspeople from Banten
Indonesian footballers
Persita Tangerang players
Arema F.C. players
Pelita Jaya FC players
Sriwijaya F.C. players
Persib Bandung players
Kuala Lumpur City F.C. players
Bhayangkara F.C. players
Liga 1 (Indonesia) players
Malaysia Super League players
2007 AFC Asian Cup players
Indonesia international footballers
Indonesia youth international footballers
Indonesian expatriate footballers
Indonesian expatriate sportspeople in Malaysia
Expatriate footballers in Malaysia
Association football defenders
Footballers at the 2014 Asian Games
Indonesian Super League-winning players
Asian Games competitors for Indonesia